Iran participated in the 2010 Asian Beach Games in Muscat, Oman on 8–16 December 2010.

Competitors

Medal summary

Medal table

Medalists

Results by event

Beach kabaddi

Men

Beach soccer

Men

Triathlon

Men

References

External links
 Official site

Nations at the 2010 Asian Beach Games
2010
Asian Beach Games